The 2018–19 Oklahoma Sooners women's basketball team represents the University of Oklahoma in the 2018–19 NCAA Division I women's basketball season. The Sooners are led by Sherri Coale in her twenty-third season. The team plays its home games at the Lloyd Noble Center in Norman, Oklahoma as a member of the Big 12 Conference. They finished the season 8–22, 4–14 in Big 12 play to finish in a tie for eighth place. They lost in the first round of the Big 12 women's tournament to Texas Tech. They missed the postseason tournament for the first time since 1998 and their first losing season in 21 years.

Roster

Schedule

|-
!colspan=9 style=| Exhibition

|-
!colspan=9 style=| Non-conference regular season

|-
! colspan=9 style=| Big 12 Regular Season

|-
!colspan=9 style=| Big 12 Women's Tournament

x- Sooner Sports Television (SSTV) is aired locally on Fox Sports. However the contract allows games to air on various affiliates. Those affiliates are FSSW, FSSW+, FSOK, FSOK+, and FCS Atlantic, Central, and Pacific.

Rankings
2018–19 NCAA Division I women's basketball rankings

See also
 2018–19 Oklahoma Sooners men's basketball team

References

External links
Official Athletics Site of the Oklahoma Sooners - Women's Basketball

2017-18
2018–19 Big 12 Conference women's basketball season
2019 in sports in Oklahoma
2018 in sports in Oklahoma